Schmack! is the debut studio album by New Zealand rock band Steriogram, released on 29 February 2004 by Capitol Records.  The album was re-released as a tour edition in 2005.  The song "Walkie Talkie Man" featured on an Apple iPod ad and a number of films and video games, and its video clip was nominated for a Grammy and four MTV music awards.

To date more than 250,000 copies of the album have been sold.

One song, "White Trash", had previously been released as a single in 2000. In addition to "Walkie Talkie Man", four others were released as singles: "Roadtrip", "Go", "Tsunami" and "On and On". "Walkie Talkie Man" debuted at #19 on the UK Singles Chart and reached #14 on the New Zealand chart. "Go" peaked at #28 in the New Zealand RIANZ Chart. The promo release of "Go" had an instrumental of "Go" on the b-side, and the UK release had "Free".

Track listing
All songs written by Tyson Kennedy, Tim Youngson, Bradley Carter, Jacob Adams, Jared Wrenell)

2004 release
"Roadtrip" - 2:59
"Walkie Talkie Man"  - 2:13
"Schmack!" - 2:25
"Was the Day" - 2:13
"White Trash" - 3:44
"In the City" - 2:41
"Go" - 2:56
"Fat and Proud" - 3:27
"Tsunami" - 3:01
"Wind It Up" - 3:14
"Be Good to Me" - 2:59
"On and On" - 3:59

Tour edition (2005) bonus tracks
"Free" 
"White Trash (DLT Remix)"
"Big Lady Lovin"
"Back in Black"

Personnel
 Tyson Kennedy - lead vocals 
 Brad Carter - co-lead vocals, lead guitar 
 Tim Youngson -  rhythm guitar, backing vocals 
 Jake Adams - bass guitar, backing vocals 
 Jared Wrennall - drums, backing vocals

Charts

Weekly charts

Year-end charts

Certifications

References

Steriogram albums
2004 debut albums
Albums produced by David Kahne